The 1974 VMI Keydets football team was an American football team that represented the Virginia Military Institute (VMI) as a member of the Southern Conference (SoCon) during the 1974 NCAA Division I football season. In their fourth year under head coach Bob Thalman, the team compiled an overall record of 7–4 with a mark of 5–1 in conference play, and finishing as SoCon champion.

Schedule

References

VMI
VMI Keydets football seasons
Southern Conference football champion seasons
VMI Keydets football